UCT Radio is a campus radio station operated by students of the University of Cape Town (UCT) in Cape Town, South Africa. According to the university website, the station broadcasts its signal from the main Upper Campus in the Southern Suburbs, and all the way across the Cape Flats towards the Northern Suburbs of the greater Cape Town area.

According to the Radio Audience Measurement Survey,  UCT Radio had a weekly listenership of 30,000 people.

Management

 Station Manager: Natalie Brandreth
 Traffic and Tech Manager: Kyle Robbertze 
 HR Manager: Torben du Toit
 Programme Manager: Resego Molope
 Marketing Manager: Spokazi Tati
 Head DJ: Michael Owen
 Production Manager: Liezel Boudreaux
 News Manager: Tej Bagirathi
 Content Manager: Reitumetse Malefane
 Music Manager: Rèné du Toit
 Online and Social Media Coordinator: Rebecca Cullum 
 Events Coordinator: Caitlin Samuels

Programming on UCT Radio

As a student-run, campus-community station, our programming reflects the culture, ethos and diversity of campus life, following a cross-genre approach to music and playing 90% of South African music.

Notable alumni

Mark Gillman (5FM presenter), Randall Abrahams (Idols SA judge), Suga (Good Hope FM/MC at 46664 events), Bongani Njoli (e.tv) and Natalie Bekker (P4/Free Spirit/Top Billing presenter).

References

External links
 UCT Radio official website
 UCT Radio live internet stream

Student radio stations in South Africa
University of Cape Town
Radio stations in Cape Town
1976 establishments in South Africa
Radio stations established in 1976